Kenneth Wayne Kinzler (born January 30, 1962) is a professor of oncology, and director of the Ludwig Center at Johns Hopkins University at the Sidney Kimmel Comprehensive Cancer Center.

Kinzler received his PhD from Johns Hopkins University in 1988. He is of German descent.

Much of his work has been in collaboration with Bert Vogelstein, beginning when Kinzler was a graduate student and Vogelstein was a new assistant professor.

He developed serial analysis of gene expression (SAGE) as a bioinformatics tool for the quantification of gene expression.

Awards 
 2002  MERIT Award, National Cancer Institute
 2006  NCI Director's Service Award
 2012  MERIT Award, National Cancer Institute
 2013  AACR Team Science Award (pancreatic cancer team)
 2014  AACR Team Science Award (brain cancer team)
 2014 Elected fellow of the AACR Academy
 2015 Elected member of the National Academy of Medicine
 2016 Elected fellow of the National Academy of Sciences
 2017 AACR Team Science Award (liquid biopsy team)
2020 The Times 'Science Power List'

References 

Fellows of the AACR Academy
American oncologists
Johns Hopkins University faculty
Cancer researchers
Living people
Members of the National Academy of Medicine
Members of the United States National Academy of Sciences
Johns Hopkins University alumni
1962 births